Humboldt Redwoods State Park is a state park of California, United States, containing Rockefeller Forest, the world's largest remaining contiguous old-growth forest of coast redwoods. The park was established by the Save the Redwoods League in 1921 largely from lands purchased from the Pacific Lumber Company. Beginning with the dedication of the Raynal Bolling Memorial Grove, it has grown to become the third-largest park in the California State Park system, now containing  through acquisitions and gifts to the state.

It is part of the Northern California coastal forests ecoregion and has  of old-growth forests.   are old-growth redwoods, comprising the entire Bull Creek watershed and the Rockefeller Forest.

Nearby U.S. Route 101, which generally follows the Eel River and its South Fork in this part of the North Coast, offers easy access to the park and nearby towns with connections to the scenic highway, Avenue of the Giants, also mostly located within or near park boundaries.

History

The original inhabitants of the area were the Sinkyone. In the 1850s white settlers began felling the redwoods, seeking to clear the land for homes and pasture. About 20 years later the timber industry moved into the region, and railways and roads were routed through the area for accessibility to the trees. In 1918 after realizing how much of the old-growth forests closer to San Francisco had been harvested, Boone and Crockett Club members formed the Save the Redwoods League, and began working to preserve redwood forests in the region, including the area that became Humboldt Redwoods State Park.   The Garden Club of America, through its Redwood Grove Committee, raised half of the funds needed to buy the 2,552 acre Canoe Creek Grove which became part of Humboldt Redwoods State Park.  Sarah Gildersleeve Fife was instrumental in the activities of this committee.

Redwoods 
The forests on alluvial plains are almost pure redwood forest, but the forests on the slopes also contain Douglas-fir.

Before the discovery of Hyperion, the tallest redwood ever measured was the Dyerville Giant, also in Humboldt Redwoods State Park. It was estimated to be 1,600 years old. The Dyerville Giant can be seen on Founders Grove Nature Trail, which honors the creators of Save the Redwoods League.
There is also an albino redwood referred to as the Christmas Tree.

Recreation

The Avenue of the Giants offers visitors a  drive through Humboldt Redwoods State Park with eight stops along an auto tour of park highlights. Visitors to the park can go horseback riding, mountain biking, fishing, and swimming in the South Fork Eel River. The park is prone to fire hazards, and camping is permitted in specified areas. Almost 250 sites are available for use, including an equestrian camp. Nearby Burlington, serves as a main camping spot, alongside Albee.

See also
List of California state parks
Redwood National and State Parks

References

External links 

Official Humboldt Redwoods State Park website
Humboldt Redwoods Interpretive Association

State parks of California
Parks in Humboldt County, California
Coast redwood groves
Old-growth forests
Protected areas established in 1921
1921 establishments in California
Pacific Lumber Company